The 1922 King's Birthday Honours in New Zealand, celebrating the official birthday of King George V, were appointments made by the King on the recommendation of the New Zealand government to various orders and honours to reward and highlight good works by New Zealanders. They were announced on 3 June 1922.

The recipients of honours are displayed here as they were styled before their new honour.

Knight Bachelor
 The Honourable Walter Charles Frederick Carncross – speaker of the Legislative Council.

Order of Saint Michael and Saint George

Companion (CMG)
 Joseph Firth – of Wellington. In recognition of public services.

Order of the British Empire

Knight Commander (KBE)
Civil division
 The Honourable Māui Pōmare   – member of the Executive Council representing the native race and minister in charge of the Cook Islands. For valuable services to the Empire.

Companion of the Imperial Service Order (ISO)
 John O'Donovan  – lately commissioner of police.

References

Birthday Honours
1922 awards
1922 in New Zealand
New Zealand awards